Palpalá is a settlement in Jujuy Province in Argentina.

The football team Altos Hornos Zapla are from Palpalá.

References

Populated places in Jujuy Province